Aldon Jay "Lefty" Wilkie (October 30, 1914 – August 5, 1992) was a Canadian-born professional baseball player. The native of Zealandia, Saskatchewan, was a left-handed pitcher who worked in 68 games pitched, 12 as a starter, in the Major Leagues over three seasons for the Pittsburgh Pirates (1941–42; 1946).

Wilkie's professional career began in 1937. After winning 13 games for the 1940 Seattle Rainiers of the Pacific Coast League, Wilkie was acquired by the Pirates that August. He appeared in 26 games during the 1941 season, and another 35 games in 1942. During his rookie campaign, he pitched the only shutout of his MLB career, blanking the Philadelphia Phillies 5–0 on six hits on June 9, 1941.

Wilkie served in the 36th Infantry Division of the United States Army in the European Theater of Operations during World War II, and was out of professional baseball from 1943 to 1945. When he returned to the Pirates in 1946, he appeared in seven games but was ineffective, compiling an earned run average of 10.57 in 7 innings pitched.

During his time in the Major Leagues, Wilkie allowed 215 hits and 80 bases on balls in 194 innings pitched, with 37 strikeouts, three complete games and three saves. He then returned to minor league baseball, playing through 1951.

References

External links 

1914 births
1992 deaths
Baseball people from Saskatchewan
Beaumont Exporters players
Canadian expatriate baseball players in the United States
Hollywood Stars players
Indianapolis Indians players
Kansas City Blues (baseball) players
Major League Baseball players from Canada
Oakland Oaks (baseball) players
Oklahoma City Indians players
Pittsburgh Pirates players
Salem Senators players
San Francisco Seals (baseball) players
Seattle Rainiers players
Tacoma Tigers players
Victoria Athletics players
United States Army personnel of World War II